Graphis palmicola is a species of script lichen in the family Graphidaceae. Found on the Nicobar Islands, it was formally described as a new species in 2005 by Urmila Makhija and Bharati Adawadkar. The type specimen was collected from a beach forest in Katchal Island, where it was found growing on a coconut tree. The species epithet, which combines the Latin Palma ("palm tree") and cola ("exists"), refers to its host.

References

palmicola
Lichen species
Lichens described in 2005
Lichens of Indo-China